Graphops curtipennis is a species of leaf beetle. It is found in North America.

According to Daccordi in 1977, the species Phortus creticus, which was originally reported from the island of Crete in Greece, is actually a synonym of Graphops curtipennis, and is not actually found on the island.

Subspecies
These two subspecies belong to the species Graphops curtipennis:
 Graphops curtipennis curtipennis (F. E. Melsheimer, 1847) i c g
 Graphops curtipennis schwarzi Blake, 1955 i c g
Data sources: i = ITIS, c = Catalogue of Life, g = GBIF, b = Bugguide.net

References

Further reading

 

Eumolpinae
Articles created by Qbugbot
Beetles described in 1847
Taxa named by Frederick Ernst Melsheimer
Beetles of North America